Marche à l'ombre is a 1984 French comedy film written and directed by Michel Blanc. The film was the most popular film in France in 1984 with over 6 million admissions.

Cast 
 Gérard Lanvin - François
 Michel Blanc - Denis
 Sophie Duez - Mathilde
 Katrine Boorman - Katrina
  - Marie-Gabrielle
  - Martine
 Maka Kotto - Joseph
  - Raymond
 Bernard Farcy - Monsieur Christian
 François Berléand - Police Inspector

References

External links 

1984 comedy films
1984 films
French comedy films
1980s French-language films
1980s French films